The Volvo XC90 is a mid-size luxury SUV manufactured and marketed by Volvo Cars since 2002 and now in its second generation.

The first generation was introduced at the 2002 North American International Auto Show and used the Volvo P2 platform shared with the first generation Volvo S80 and other large Volvo cars. It was manufactured at Volvo's Torslandaverken. Volvo moved production equipment of the first generation to China and ended Swedish production at the end of 2014, renaming the car as the Volvo XC Classic (or Volvo XC90 Classic).

At the end of 2014, the second generation XC90 was introduced. It is based on a new global platform, the Scalable Product Architecture (SPA). Both generations of the XC90 have won Motor Trends SUV of the Year award in their debuts.

In late 2022, the electric-only EX90 was introduced as the successor of the XC90.

First generation (2002) 

In January 2001, Volvo débuted its Adventure Concept Car at the North American International Auto Show, to gauge reaction to the styling and features of its upcoming SUV. In November 2001, Volvo released a teaser image showing the frontal styling of the production version, named the XC90. Notable as Volvo's first SUV model, the styling of the XC90 recalled the concept. In January 2002, the full XC90 unveiling occurred, at the North American International Auto Show. Production began in August 2002, after Volvo's traditional mid-year shutdown, with the first XC90s coming out of the Torslanda factory in Sweden.

At its North American launch for the 2003 model year, the XC90 was presented with a choice of two trim levels, the 2.5 T and the T6. The 2.5 T was the entry level version and offered a 2.5-litre B5254T2 "T5" turbocharged inline-five engine, producing  and  mated to an Aisin co-developed five-speed AW55-50/51 automatic. While the 2.5T came standard with front-wheel drive, a Haldex Traction all-wheel drive (AWD) system was optional. The T6 was offered only with the AWD system.

A Yamaha V8 engine was added in 2005. Volvo sold just over 40,000 XC90 units in North America that year.

The XC90 won the North American Car of the Year award and Motor Trend magazine's Sport/Utility of the Year for 2003.

Jeremy Clarkson, ex-host of Top Gear, has previously owned three XC90s, and claims they were designed by "someone who must've had children due to its practicality."

Facelifts

2007 update

The XC90 was updated for 2007 with a restyled front and rear and a revised interior. The  3.2 L SI6 straight-6 engine replaced the  B524T2 straight-5 in the base model for the US market. The 2007 XC90 debuted in April 2006 at the New York Auto Show.

2009, 2010, and 2012 updates

For model year (MY) 2009, the XC90 received a new rear logo, featuring larger lettering with wider spaces between the "VOLVO" letters.

In 2010, all XC90 models received painted wheel arches (previously they were optional). In addition, a new, larger, circular Volvo logo appeared on the front grille.

For MY 2012, new LED tail-lights became available on certain models, although entry-level models retain the previous style. For MY 2013, the XC90 received a cosmetic refresh that included standard LED daytime running lights and taillights, and exterior revisions including body colour bumpers, rocker panels and silver trim replacing black plastic trim.

First generation models

XC90 Ocean Race
In 2001 Volvo became the main sponsor of an around-the-world sailing race, now called the Volvo Ocean Race.  The 2005 edition was the first in which all competitors used the same boat known as the Volvo Open 70,  a  racing yacht made for a crew of 10+ and to be robust enough to survive the open ocean.

In early 2006, Volvo released a special version called Ocean Race Edition. Special blue colour, leather interior with contrast stitching and special interior trim. A total of 800 were made.

XC Classic
The first generation Volvo XC90 was sold in China as the XC Classic. It was produced at the Volvo factory located in Daqing, Heilongjiang Province, with necessary tooling shipped from Sweden.
Equipment levels were changed compared to the international versions, and only one engine, a 2.5L turbo petrol 5-cylinder engine with 220 hp, was available. All XC Classic models came with AWD as standard and either a 5-speed manual or 5-speed automatic transmission. It was priced below the second generation XC90.

Engines

Safety
The Volvo XC90's front end is designed to absorb frontal impacts and also deflect any pedestrians up on to the hood of the vehicle rather than underneath the vehicle. Volvo has patented the unique frontal structure that features crumple zones, and predetermined positions for the engine and other ancillaries during a frontal impact.

The XC90's roof is reinforced with ultra-high-strength steel to help prevent a collapse in the passenger cavity in the event of a roll-over. This Volvo system is marketed as ROPS, and is closely associated with the Roll Stability Control (RSC), electronic stability control (DSTC), and SIPS systems of Volvo to prevent and ultimately minimise accident forces. The National Highway Traffic Safety Administration measures the roll-over risk of the 2013 XC90 as 17.9%. The maximum sideway thrust is 0.77g.

The XC90's rear structure has been designed to absorb impact energy, with occupants are also protected by a whiplash protection system. Marketed as WHIPS, the system cradles the occupants during a rear-end collision.

The Insurance Institute for Highway Safety awarded the Volvo XC90 their Top Safety Pick award. The XC90 was granted the IIHS's rating of "good" in front, side, rear and roof strength tests and has Electronic Stability Control as standard equipment to receive the award.

The industry-first Roll Stability Control was first introduced in XC90 in 2003.

At the end of July 2007, Volvo Car Corp. announced the recall of 42,211 2005 model year XC90s for risk of battery short circuit and fire. The vehicles were manufactured in the Swedish Torslanda Plant between 7 June 2004, and 13 May 2005. The recall only applies to cars in the US and Canada. There have been no reports of short circuiting in the vehicles.

1 vehicle structure rated "Good"
2 strength-to-weight ratio: 4.51
3 seat/head restraint geometry rated "Good"

Second generation (2015) 

In May 2012 Volvo announced that the second generation XC90 would go into production in late 2014, with orders being taken in 2014 and the vehicle officially going on sale in 2015. The SUV would be sold in Europe, Asia and North America, with the United States expected to account for at least a third of global sales.

Volvo had begun development of a second generation XC90 using Ford's EUCD platform under the codename Y305, but was cancelled in 2008 as Ford wouldn't have enough funds to also facelift the rest of the Volvo lineup.

The XC90 is based on Volvo's new platform, marketed as Scalable Product Architecture (SPA) technology which features a stronger platform offering weight reduction while improving safety and efficiency.

The vehicle is longer, wider and lower than its predecessor. All engines in the XC90 are 2.0-litre four-cylinder Drive-E powertrains with Volvo's eight-speed Geartronic transmission, delivered by Aisin. The line-up include two petrol engines: a twincharged  T6, producing  of torque and a turbocharged  T5, producing  of torque, two diesel engines: a twin turbo  D5, producing  of torque and a turbocharged  D4, producing  of torque.

The First Edition of the all-new Volvo XC90, was 1,927 individually numbered cars only available for sale via digital commerce, and sold out in 47 hours after orders opened on 3 September 2014. All 1,927 of the First Edition models, which could feature either the Petrol T6 or Diesel D5 engine, were finished in Onyx Black and feature 21-inch alloy wheels and include every available vehicle option. The limited production run number represents the year the Swedish brand was launched, with each model fitted with uniquely numbered tread plates and a distinctive rear mounted badge, with customers able to select their XC90 First Edition numbers. Number 1 was allocated to Carl XVI Gustav, the King of Sweden, with number 10 going to Zlatan Ibrahimović, a Swedish professional footballer.

Design

The new XC90 has a redesigned chassis with double wishbone front suspension and a new integral link rear axle incorporating transverse leaf spring of lightweight material. The new XC90 can also be equipped with electronically controlled air suspension with a choice of five modes.

The interior features a 9" tablet-like touch screen control console along with steering wheel controls and voice-control system, all linked to an interface, marketed as Sensus, which allows for access to cloud-based apps including Internet radio, connected navigation, parking, music streaming, Apple CarPlay and Android Auto, and a Wi-Fi hot spot for using a tablet in the car. Other features include a gear lever made of Orrefors crystal as well as diamond-cut controls for the start/stop button and drive mode control, located on the centre console between the driver and passenger seats.

The highest level audio system in the XC90 features a 1400W Class-D amplifier and 19 Bowers & Wilkins speakers as well as one of the first air-ventilated subwoofers in a car. Integrated into the car body, it turns the entire interior space into a large subwoofer. The latest sound processing software has been used to manage the timing of the sound and co-ordination of the speakers.

The vehicle's seats have also been redesigned with adjustable side bolsters, seat cushion extension and massage. The second row features three individual seats with recline adjustment. A sliding function can be used to create more legroom for the passengers in the third row or to increase loading space. An integrated child booster cushion in the centre seat is available. The Volvo XC90 seats 5 people in two rows of seating or seats 7 people in three rows of seating. The former was discontinued in 2017 for the 2018 model year. Second-row captain chairs, which eliminates the centre seat in the 2nd-row and reduces capacity to six people, became optional on the Volvo XC90 in 2019 for the 2020 model year.

Volvo Cars' air purification system has been improved by adding a new carbon filter for more efficient capture of small, particles and pollen in the incoming air. The second generation XC90 offers a 360° view system capable of providing the driver with a birds-eye view, whereby information from all cameras is gathered and digitally integrated in a central processor to form a 360° image. The rear sensing system, marketed as Park Assist Pilot, offers automatic reversing into a parking bay.

The 2nd generation XC90 was the first Volvo to carry the company's new, more prominent iron mark, which has the iconic arrow aligned with the diagonal metallic slash across the grille, along with T-shaped LED daytime running lights known as "Thor's Hammer" by Volvo designers.

The car is available in five trim levels (Volvo describing it as "expressions"), namely Kinetic (base trim level), Momentum, Inscription (a more luxurious trim), R-design (a sportier trim) and Excellence (ultra-luxury).

Safety
The Second Generation Volvo XC90 SUV feature (IntelliSafe), including Run-off-road protection package and Auto brake at intersection.

The Volvo XC90 safety systems include:
 Run-off-road protection package. In a run-off-road scenario, the all-new Volvo XC90 detects what is happening and the front safety belts are tightened to keep the occupants in position. To help prevent Spinal cord injury, energy-absorbing functionality between the seat and seat frame cushions the vertical forces that can arise when the car encounters a hard landing in the terrain.
 City Safety with auto brake in intersections. The XC90 is the first car in the world with technology that features automatic braking if the driver turns in front of an oncoming car. This is a common scenario at busy city crossings as well as on highways, where the speed limits are higher.
 IntelliSafe with City Safety has become the umbrella name for all of Volvo Cars' auto brake Collision avoidance functions, which are standard equipment in the new XC90. This equipment now covers vehicles, cyclists and pedestrians in front of the car during both day and night.
 Adaptive Cruise Control with Pilot Assist traffic jam assistant enables safe and comfortable semi-autonomous driving by automatically following the vehicle ahead in stop-and-go traffic. Acceleration, braking and now also steering are controlled automatically.

Pilot Assist II model year 2017
A lane departure warning system includes a semi-autonomous drive technology, Pilot Assist II as standard on the XC90 in selected markets for model year 2017.

The Volvo brand has also made the claim that "By 2020, nobody shall be seriously injured or killed in a new Volvo."

Euro NCAP tested a 2015 XC90 (model year 2016), 5-door SUV with standard equipment. Euro NCAP regards the XC90 model as a "best in class" performer. NHTSA only recorded for rollover.

The Insurance Institute for Highway Safety also crash-tested the XC90, and presented the following results:

1 vehicle structure rated "Good"
2 strength-to-weight ratio: 5.18
3 seat/head restraint geometry rated "Good"

With over 50,000 vehicles sold in the UK by 2018, no driver or passenger fatality had been recorded.

T8

The T8 plug-in hybrid version of the XC90 is based on technology used in the Volvo V60 PHEV. The batteries, which are situated at the centre of the vehicle, can be charged using an electric vehicle charger and can also store energy recovered by regenerative braking. Volvo says that the XC90 T8 sacrifices no passenger or cargo space to accommodate the hybrid equipment.

The vehicle emits 49 g/km of CO2 and has an all-electric range of  under the New European Driving Cycle. Normal driving is conducted in the default hybrid mode, but the driver can switch to a mode that uses only electric power, with zero emission driving.

The EPA, under its five-cycle tests, rated the 2016 model year XC90 T8 energy consumption in all-electric mode at 58 kWh per 100 miles, which translates into a combined city/highway fuel economy of 53 miles per gallon gasoline equivalent (MPG-e) ( gasoline equivalent).

At launch, for the 2016 model year, the XC90 T8 used a  lithium-ion battery ( usable). Over time, Volvo continued to gradually increase the battery size.

Deliveries of the XC90 T8 PHEV began in the United States in August 2015. Sales in Europe totaled 2,653 units in 2015. Cumulative sales in the US totaled 488 units up until February 2016. According to Volvo, sales of the plug-in variant represent 20% of Volvo XC90 global sales by mid-March 2016.

In 2021 the T8 powertrain was updated with a more powerful electric motor (delivering ), updated engine and increased battery capacity.

Trim levels

The second-generation Volvo XC90 is available in three distinct trim levels: Momentum, R Design, and Inscription. Momentum is the "base" design, and does not include features such as full leather-trimmed seating surfaces, woodgrain interior trim, or a GPS navigation system as standard equipment. The R Design features "Nubuck" upholstery and a sports exterior body kit, as well as dark trim accents on the exterior and interior. Inscription is the top-of-the-line design, and features full perforated Napa leather-trimmed seating surfaces, woodgrain interior trim, dual heated front and outboard rear seats, and additional bright accents on the exterior. For 2017, an "Excellence" trim was introduced (see below) with the "T8" plug-in hybrid (PHEV) powertrain as standard equipment, as well as additional luxury features.

XC90 T8 Excellence 
For 2017, a new "Excellence" trim level was introduced as a luxury-oriented version of the XC90. The Excellence offered a four-passenger (front/rear) seating configuration, which included rear "lounge" bucket seats that were heated and ventilated. Additional features included the Bowers and Wilkins premium surround-sound audio system with amplifier, heated and ventilated front and rear seats, a dual-pane panoramic power moonroof, rear seat entertainment system, and the "T8" plug-in hybrid (PHEV) powertrain. There were a limited number of additional options available for the Excellence trim. The Excellence trim was discontinued following the 2020 model year, leaving the Inscription as the top trim level of the XC90.

Facelift (2019)

In May 2019, for the 2020 model year, the Volvo XC90 received a mid-cycle facelift. The facelift included revised front and rear fascias, a new front grille design, and the previous Excellence trim was discontinued. For the 2021 model year, the "T8" powertrain was renamed the "XC90 Recharge".

In 2021, for the 2022 model year, the base Momentum was replaced with the Core model, the R Design replaced with the Plus model, and the Inscription replaced with the Ultimate. All models include features as standard which were previously cost-extra options.

Markets

Asia Markets
Volvos sold in Indonesia, the Philippines, Taiwan, Thailand, and Vietnam are all imported from Malaysia's Volvo factory in Shah Alam.

Technical data

Awards and recognition
 Motor Trend's 2003 SUV of the Year
 Motor Trend's 2016 SUV of the Year
 Yahoo Autos 2016 Tech Ride of the Year
 Yahoo Autos 2016 Ride of the Year
 2016 North American Car and Truck/Utility of the Year - Detroit Motor Show 2016
 2015 Best AWD SUV - Australia's Best Cars
 2016 South African Car of the Year
 The 2016 XC90 was named one of the top ten tech cars in 2016 by IEEE Spectrum.

Sales

References

External links
 
 Volvo XC90 International
 Official Volvo XC90 Luxury SUV Sweden
 Official Volvo XC90 Luxury SUV UK

XC90
Mid-size sport utility vehicles
Crossover sport utility vehicles
Luxury crossover sport utility vehicles
Front-wheel-drive vehicles
All-wheel-drive vehicles
Euro NCAP large off-road
Cars introduced in 2002
2010s cars
2020s cars
Plug-in hybrid vehicles